The 1874 North Lincolnshire by-election was fought on 16 March 1874.  The byelection was fought due to the incumbent Conservative MP, Rowland Winn, becoming Lord Commissioner of the Treasury.  It was retained by the incumbent.

References

1874 elections in the United Kingdom
1874 in England
March 1874 events
By-elections to the Parliament of the United Kingdom in Lincolnshire constituencies
Unopposed ministerial by-elections to the Parliament of the United Kingdom in English constituencies
19th century in Lincolnshire